Christopher Mark Hurst (born 3 October 1974, in Barnsley) is an English former professional footballer who played in the Football League as a midfielder for Huddersfield Town, making four appearances in the 1997-98 season before returning to non-league football.

He also played non-league football for Emley, Halifax Town, Ilkeston Town, Frickley Athletic, Gainsborough Trinity, Worksop Town, and Ossett Town.

Hurst's younger brother Glynn also played professional football.

References

External links
 

1973 births
Living people
Footballers from Barnsley
English footballers
English Football League players
Association football midfielders
Wakefield F.C. players
Huddersfield Town A.F.C. players
Halifax Town A.F.C. players
Ilkeston Town F.C. (1945) players
Frickley Athletic F.C. players
Gainsborough Trinity F.C. players
Worksop Town F.C. players
Ossett Town F.C. players